John Phillips Naber (born January 20, 1956) is an American former competitive swimmer, five-time Olympic medalist and former world record-holder in multiple events.

Born in Evanston, Illinois, Naber studied in England and Italy where his father worked as a management consultant. He graduated from Woodside High School in Northern California, then completed his bachelor's degree in psychology in 1977 at the University of Southern California in Los Angeles. While at USC, he led the Trojans to four consecutive NCAA titles (1974–1977).

1976 Olympics

At age twenty, Naber won four gold medals at the 1976 Summer Olympics in Montreal, Quebec. Each of these victories was swum in world-record time; he swept the two backstroke events and was a member of two winning relay teams. He also won a silver medal in the 200-meter freestyle, part of a U.S. sweep in that event.

One of Naber's gold medals was for the first 200-meter backstroke completed in under two minutes; his world record time of 1:59.19 stood for seven years.  His world record of 55.49 seconds in the 100-meter backstroke also stood for seven years.

For these accomplishments in Montreal and elsewhere, Naber won the 1977 James E. Sullivan Award, which is presented to the top American amateur athlete of the year.  He was inducted into the International Swimming Hall of Fame as an "Honor Swimmer" in 1982.

After swimming
Naber joined The Walt Disney Company in 1977 as a marketing representative, then became a full-time "roving ambassador" for the swimwear maker Speedo. He later was a sports broadcaster, motivational speaker, and professional writer. He was a member of the 1984 Los Angeles Olympics Organizing Committee.

In May 2014, Naber was inducted into Woodside High School's Community Hall of Fame.

See also

 List of multiple Olympic gold medalists
 List of multiple Olympic gold medalists at a single Games
 List of Olympic medalists in swimming (men)
 List of University of Southern California people
 List of World Aquatics Championships medalists in swimming (men)
 World record progression 100 metres backstroke
 World record progression 200 metres backstroke
 World record progression 4 × 100 metres medley relay
 World record progression 4 × 200 metres freestyle relay

References

External links

 
 

1956 births
20th-century American people
21st-century American people
Living people
American male backstroke swimmers
American male freestyle swimmers
World record setters in swimming
James E. Sullivan Award recipients
Medalists at the 1976 Summer Olympics
Olympic gold medalists for the United States in swimming
Olympic silver medalists for the United States in swimming
Sportspeople from Evanston, Illinois
Swimmers at the 1976 Summer Olympics
Swimming commentators
USC Trojans men's swimmers
World Aquatics Championships medalists in swimming